Alexander Walker (born 25 April 1984) is a Scottish former professional footballer.

Walker has previously played for Rangers and Greenock Morton, as well as having loan spells at Clyde and Brechin City. He played mainly as a defender, although he also played in midfield.

Career
He began his career at Rangers, where he made 2 appearances. Walker made his senior league début in a 1–0 win over Motherwell at Fir Park, coming off the bench to replace Hamed Namouchi. Walker had a six-month loan spell at Clyde in which he made his Bully Wee début in a 1–0 victory at Broadwood Stadium against Ross County. During this time, Walker won the SFL young player of the month award for September 2004. After his short-term deal at Broadwood, Walker went to Sweden for a couple of months but decided to come back home. he joined Morton in July 2005. Walker made his Morton début in a 3–2 (AET) Challenge Cup win over Gretna, in which assistant boss at Morton, Derek Collins, and later-to-be teammate Ryan McGuffie played for the opposition. His senior league debut was the following week against Raith Rovers, in which Morton triumphed 2–0 in front of 3,222 fans. He signed a new contract in May 2009, for another year at Morton. Being out of contract in the summer, and struggling for fitness, Walker was loaned to Brechin City for three months in January 2010. Walker suffered a recurrence of a groin injury, where he underwent surgery but remained at Brechin until April. He was released at the end of the 2009–10 season. After his release from Morton, Walker decided to go part-time and was signed up by ex-manager Jim McInally at East Stirlingshire for the 2010–11 season.

Honours

Club
Greenock Morton
Scottish Second Division: 2006–07

See also
Clyde F.C. season 2004-05
Greenock Morton F.C. season 2008-09 | 2009–10

References

External links

Living people
1984 births
Footballers from Bellshill
Scottish footballers
Rangers F.C. players
Clyde F.C. players
East Stirlingshire F.C. players
Greenock Morton F.C. players
Association football utility players
Scottish Football League players
Scottish Premier League players
Brechin City F.C. players
Association football defenders